Dheerwas Bara is a village in Taranagar Tehsil in Churu district in Rajasthan, India. It is on Taranagar Sahwa road, 7 km away from Sahwa. This village has its own Gram panchayat including some other villages Dheerwas Chhota etc.Everyone lives together here.

It is mainly a desert area. Here are some visiting places like Baniyo ki Chhatriyan, Dharmasala,ranadheer temple. There is few Temple, where people pray to their God. A big water works, near bus stand that connect the Sahwa water works to Taranagar city. There is a big playgrounds near the Bus stand, where some time Cricket matches are organised. Near the village there is a small canal (Nala), which has provided many benefit to the farmers.

Here most of people are farmers near about 60% and near 20% are Govt. Worker and rest are doing their own business.  There are good  school also. There are many student  studying in Rajasthan University, Chaudhary College Taranagar, Pilania College Taranagar, etc. famous institutes.

Villages in Churu district